APOBEC ("apolipoprotein B mRNA editing enzyme, catalytic polypeptide") is a family of evolutionarily conserved cytidine deaminases.

A mechanism of generating protein diversity is mRNA editing.  Members of this family are C-to-U editing enzymes.  The N-terminal domain of APOBEC like proteins is the catalytic domain, while the C-terminal domain is a pseudocatalytic domain. More specifically, the catalytic domain is a zinc dependent cytidine deaminase domain and is essential for cytidine deamination. RNA editing by APOBEC-1 requires homodimerisation and this complex interacts with RNA binding proteins to form the editosome.

In humans/mammals they help protect from viral infections. These enzymes, when misregulated, are a major source of mutation in numerous cancer types.

A 2013 review discussed the structural and biophysical aspects of APOBEC3 family enzymes. Many of the APOBEC protein features are described in the widely studied APOBEC3G's page.

Family members
Human genes encoding members of the APOBEC protein family include:
APOBEC1
APOBEC2
APOBEC3A
APOBEC3B
APOBEC3C
APOBEC3D ("APOBEC3E" now refers to this)
APOBEC3F
APOBEC3G
APOBEC3H
APOBEC4
Activation-induced (cytidine) deaminase (AID)

References

EC 3.5.4